Volkan Şen (born 7 July 1987) is a Turkish professional footballer who plays as a winger. He is under contract with Adana Demirspor. He is mostly known for his long shots, his dribbling and speed.

Club career
He was born in Bursa and started playing football in Bursa Merinosspor between 2000–02. He started his professional career at Bursaspor in 2005 as an 18-year-old and loaned again to Bursa Merinosspor between 2005–07. In his first season, he made his mark in league (scored 3 goals in 25 matches) and cup competitions (played 4 matches). 

In August 2011, Volkan signed for Trabzonspor on a 4-year contract. But in August 2013, Volkan was brought to tears from insults emanating from Trabzonspor supporters and eventually abandoned the pitch. The fans were insulting his recently deceased mother. 

In 2014, he returned to Bursaspor, and in 2015 he signed for Fenerbahçe. On 25 May 2016, he was suspended five months from UEFA competitions after pushing referee Ivan Bebek following an incident where he sent off in a UEFA Europa League round of 16 game against Braga on 17 March 2016.

Ahead of the 2017–18 season, the contract between Şen and Fenerbahçe was terminated. Towards the end of the 2017 summer transfer period, he was signed by his former club Trabzonspor. After only half a season, Şen left Trabzon and moved to Konyaspor.

After Şen had been a free agent for the 2018–19 season, he signed a two-year contract with TFF First League club Adana Demirspor in the summer of 2019. It was reported that he left the club in June 2021. According to the Turkish Football Federation, his contract with Adana Demirspor has been extended to 2023 on 1 June 2021 and was not terminated. Despite that, the club did not register him for their league roster for the 2021–22 or 2022–23 season. A loan to Tuzlaspor was arranged in February 2022 and then terminated in late March without Şen making any appearances for Tuzlaspor.

International career
He made his debut for Turkey at the age of 22, starting in a 2–0 friendly win against Honduras on 3 March 2010. He is part of the Turkish national team for Euro 2016. On 11 November 2016, Şen scored his first goal ever for Turkey in a 2018 FIFA World Cup qualification match against Kosovo. Turkey won 2–0.

International goals
As of 18 June 2017. Turkey score listed first, score column indicates score after each Şen goal.

Honours
Bursaspor
Süper Lig: 2009–10

References

External links
 
 

1987 births
Living people
Sportspeople from Bursa
Turkish footballers
Turkey international footballers
Turkey under-21 international footballers
Bursaspor footballers
Trabzonspor footballers
Fenerbahçe S.K. footballers
Konyaspor footballers
Adana Demirspor footballers
Tuzlaspor players
Süper Lig players
TFF First League players
Association football midfielders
UEFA Euro 2016 players